Dada Boat is a television programme that shows daily on Original Black Entertainment TV (OBE). It has some similarities to Taxi Driver, another popular Ghanaian programme.

Setting
The story is set in Accra, Ghana, where a young man named Dada Boat, played by Mikki Osei Berko, is involved in various comical situations and scams. The comedy in Dada Boat arises from his attempt to imitate African-American hip-hop culture, which is somewhat frowned upon by the Ghanaian locals. He is often seen wearing various items of jewellery and in particular, a large chain. His best friend is Hotman, another character in the programme. Although the story is fictional, it is set in a real life setting, unlike other programmes, which are often recorded on specially made sets. Dada Boat is a relative of the character in Taxi Driver known as "Master Richard". They are both played by the Ghanaian actor Mikki Osei Berko.

References 

Ghanaian television series
Ghanaian comedy television series
2010s Ghanaian television series